Juho Vihtori Vainio (2 August 1890, Jokioinen – 25 March 1942) was a Finnish filer and politician. He was a Member of the Parliament of Finland from 1922 to 1923, representing the Socialist Workers' Party of Finland (SSTP). He was imprisoned on sedition charges in 1923.

References

1890 births
1942 deaths
People from Jokioinen
People from Häme Province (Grand Duchy of Finland)
Socialist Workers Party of Finland politicians
Members of the Parliament of Finland (1922–24)
Prisoners and detainees of Finland
People convicted of sedition
Finnish politicians convicted of crimes